The PEN New England Award (previously L. L. Winship/PEN New England Award and Laurence L. & Thomas Winship/PEN New England Award) is awarded annually by PEN New England (today PEN America Boston) to honor a New England author or book with a New England setting or subject. The award was established in 1975 by The Boston Globe in conjunction with PEN to honor the veteran Boston Globe editor Laurence L. Winship.

Since 2005, the award has been presented in three categories: fiction, non-fiction, and poetry with each winner receiving $1,000. For one year in 2012, the award was called the Laurence L. & Thomas Winship/PEN New England Award in honor of father and son, Thomas Winship, both long-time Boston Globe editors. It was renamed to simply PEN New England Award starting with the 2013 award.
 
The award presentation is sponsored in part by the JFK Presidential Library. The award is one of many PEN awards sponsored by International PEN affiliates in over 145 PEN centres around the world.

Winners

1975-2004

2005-present

References

External links
PEN New England Award, official website
List of winners at LibraryThing

PEN New England awards
Awards established in 1975
1975 establishments in the United States
American poetry awards
American non-fiction literary awards
American fiction awards